St. James Collegiate is a grade 9 to 12 secondary school in Winnipeg, Manitoba. It is part of the St. James-Assiniboia School Division. The school was the first secondary school established in the division but has since been transformed with a focus on technology programming. Recently the school's academic classes have begun to use a 21st-century approach rooted in UDL. Many teachers are infusing technology in their lesson design for the purposes of digital learning.  The rich diversity of the student body greatly contributes to one of the most positive and engaged school cultures in the province of Manitoba.

References

External links
St. James Collegiate Website
St. James-Assiniboia School Division

High schools in Winnipeg
Educational institutions in Canada with year of establishment missing
St. James, Winnipeg